A pneumonectomy (or pneumectomy) is a surgical procedure to remove a lung first successfully done in 1933 by Dr. Evarts Graham. This is not to be confused with a lobectomy or segmentectomy, which only removes one part of the lung. 

There are two types of pneumonectomy, simple and extra pleural. A simple pneumonectomy removes just the lung. An extra pleural pneumonectomy take away part of the diaphragm, the parietal pleura, and the pericardium on that side as well.

Indications
The most common reason for a pneumonectomy is to remove tumourous tissue arising from lung cancer. Other reasons can arise are a traumatic lung injury, bronchiectasis, tuberculosis, a congenital defect, and fungal infections.

Contraindications

Tests 
The operation will reduce the respiratory capacity of the patient and before conducting a pneumonectomy, survivability after the removal has to be assessed. If at all possible, a pulmonary function test (PFT) should be done prior. It has been found that forced expiratory volume in one second (FEV1) and diffusion capacity of the lungs (DLCO) provides the best indicator of survival. Other tools can be used to assess effectiveness as well such as cardiopulmonary exercise testing to measure maximal oxygen consumption (Vo(2) max), stair climbing, shuttle walk test, and a 6-min walk test

Pathologies 
If someone has severe valvular disease, severe pulmonary hypertension, or poor ventricular function or if cancer has spread from the lungs into the other intra-abdominal structures, ribs, or contralateral hemithorax, it is contraindicated.

Surgical Approach 
Posterolateral thoracotomy using the fourth or fifth intercostal space is the most common approach used for pneumonectomy. In case of inflammatory and infectious indications, excision of the fifth rib may be necessary to achieve adequate surgical exposure if there is rib crowding.

Video-assisted thoracoscopic surgery (VATS) approach: VATS pneumonectomy is a safe and feasible treatment for advanced malignant and benign diseases and has lower morbidity.

Robotic pneumonectomy for lung cancer is a safe procedure and a reasonable alternative to thoracotomy. With a sound technique most procedures can be completed robotically without any major complications.

Anatomical Changes 
After a pneumonectomy is performed changes in the thoracic cavity occur to compensate for the altered anatomy. The remaining lung hyperinflates as well as shifting over along with the heart towards the now empty space. This space is full of air initially after surgery, but then it is absorbed and  fluid eventually takes its place.

History

Pioneering dates 
 1895: first pneumonectomy in multiple stages by William Macewen on a patient with tuberculosis and emphysema
 1912: first anatomical dissection lobectomy by Hugh Morriston Davies
 1918: first successful lobectomy, by Harold Brunn
 1931: first successful pneumonectomy in two stages by Rudolph Nissen on a patient with crush injury to the thorax
 1933: first successful single-stage total pneumonectomy by Graham and Singer
 1939: first segmentectomy, by Churchill and Belsey

Is it possible to live with one Lung after a Pneumonectomy?
Living a one-lunged life may sound scary but it is totally compatible with life. Although it is not possible for the lung to re-grow like the liver but the body does compensate by slow and gradual expansion of the other remaining lung towards the void. Post pneumonectomy patients in due time reach about 70-80 percent of their pre surgery lung function. The heart also drifts towards the post pneumonectomy space. A fluid fills the residual space in the chest cavity which slowly gelatinizes into a proteinaceous material and the chest scaffold collapses slightly. This is how nature helps to obliterate the “empty space” left behind by removal of a lung. People have gone back to living near normal life including running marathons after a pneumonectomy provided adequate cardio-pulmonary conditioning has happened.

Complications
Most common complications after a pneumonectomy are:

 Cardiac arrhythmias
 Pulmonary complications like pneumonia, atelectasis, respiratory failure
 bronchopleural fistula
 Injury to the diaphragm, liver, spleen, or a major vessel
 Postpneumonectomy pulmonary edema
 Postpneumonectomy cardiac herniation

See also
 Medical ventilator
 List of surgeries by type

References

External links

 

Lung cancer
Pulmonary thoracic surgery
Surgical oncology
Surgical removal procedures
Thoracic surgical procedures